Dances of Death (and Other Walking Shadows) is the fourth album from progressive thrash metal band Mekong Delta, released in 1990.

Track listing
 "Dances of Death" – 19:11
Introduction – 1:11 (0:00–1:11)
Eruption – 1:34 (1:11–2:45)
Beyond the Gates – 4:53 (2:45–7:38)
Outburst – 1:19 (7:38–8:57)
Days of Betrayal – 4:14 (8:57–13:11)
Restless – 00:53 (13:11–14:04)
Sanctuary – 3:01 (14:04–17:05)
Finale – 2:06 (17:05–19:11)
 "Transgressor" – 3:18 
 "True Believers" – 5:25
 "Night on a Bare Mountain" – 10:24

Remastered CD edition bonus track
"The Gnome" – 2:54

Band line-up
Doug Lee – vocals
Uwe Baltrusch – guitars
Ralph Hubert – bass guitar
Jörg Michael – drums

Additional credits
Joachim Luetke – Cover art

Notes
"Night on a Bare Mountain" was originally written by the Russian composer Modest Mussorgsky.
"The Gnome" is the 1st movement of Mussorgsky's suite Pictures at an Exhibition.

1990 albums
Mekong Delta (band) albums